The Foundling is a 1916 silent film directed by John B. O'Brien. The film is a remake of the lost film The Foundling and serves as its replacement, as the 1915 Allan Dwan directed version was destroyed in the nitrate fire at Famous Players September 11, 1915.

Plot
Molly O (Mary Pickford) is a poor little girl whose mother died in childbirth and father David King (Edward Martindel) rejects her. When David departs to Italy to paint his dead wife as the Madonna, Molly O is left behind in a cruel orphanage. She is beloved by the other pupils, but becomes enemies with the matron's niece Jennie (Mildred Morris). As a result, she is shipped off to live with a boardinghouse proprietress (Maggie Weston). She is treated more like a slave than as an adopted daughter and decides to run away.

Meanwhile, King returned from Italy and is now a wealthy and successful painter. He regrets having left behind his daughter and now longs for her presence. Jennie pretends to be Molly O to make profit of his wealth and is adopted by him. However, Molly O returns as well. Afraid to tell the truth, she serves as his maid.

Cast
 Mary Pickford - Molly O
 Edward Martindel - David King
 Maggie Weston - Mrs. Grimes
 Mildred Morris - Jennie
 Marcia Harris - Julia Ember
 Tammany Young - Crook
 James Kirkwood, Sr.

References

External links

1916 films
American black-and-white films
American silent feature films
1916 drama films
Silent American drama films
Films directed by John B. O'Brien
1910s American films